Robotics Design Inc. is a company that designs and builds modular robots, founded and incorporated in Montreal, Quebec, Canada, in 1997.  The company produces mobile robots, robotic manipulators and manual arms as well as custom solutions using modular robotic technology.  The company developed the BIXI bike dock, a public bike system, and the ADC (Automatic Deployable Container), a deployable structure container for quick deployment of housing, hospitals and other buildings.

History

Robotics Design was founded in 1997 by Charles Khairallah M.ing. In 2000, Robotics Design Inc. released the first AMI-100 which was sold to the ETS university for research purposes. In 2003 Robotics Design Inc. became a member of the Canadian Intelligent Systems Companies. By 2004 the ANATROLLER line of mobile robots was introduced to the market with the arrival of the ARI-100 and, by 2006, the ARE-100 and ARI-50 joined the roster.

Technology
Invented by Charles Khairallah in 1995, ANAT technology allows the creation of self-reconfiguring modular robots using U and H shaped modules, which are claimed to be more durable than previous L shaped modules. This allows any robot to be formed from connected identical modules, reducing the cost of manufacturing these products and increasing their work efficiency. It has led to the creation of several families of modular robots which have been used primarily for industrial purposes. ANAT technology was recognized as a nominee for the 2010 Manning Innovation Awards.

Mobile Robots
The ANATROLLER series of robots are a family of mobile robots based on modular ANAT technology. The first was the ANATROLLER ARI-100 which was launched in 2003 in North America. In 2010 the Kel'air duct cleaning company, a French company based in Bordeaux, acquired one of these, the first in the European market.

 The ANATROLLER ARI-100 is an industrial robot used primarily for duct cleaning. It can support a number of accessories allowing it to be used for welding, nuclear reactor maintenance, and materials handling. These accessories can be attached to its articulated arm which can bend in four directions. Its symmetrical design allows it to continue driving when flipped on either side.
 The ANATROLLER ARI-50 is a smaller sized industrial duct cleaning robot, the ARI-50 can fit into  spaces, climb obstacles and slopes, and carry loads. This robot's arm is stationary, although accessories can still be attached. Its modular design is made from half of the ARI-100, and can be connected to other ARI-50 robots like Lego blocks to form new robots.
 The ANATROLLER ARI-10 is a miniature duct cleaning robot specialized for residential duct cleaning with an advanced movement system that allows it to climb metallic surfaces vertically. It is equipped with HD cameras and a rugged metallic cable, and is fully customizable for special applications.
 The ANATROLLER ARE-100 is a wireless industrial robot whose base is constructed from a mono-block module and weighs . It can climb obstacles, slopes of 45° and tow . A basic modular mobile robot with an open architecture, the ARE-100 is used primarily for research purposes. Researchers can use the ARE-100 to develop specialized intelligent robotic projects for security applications. Such applications as human-machine interaction, mobile system navigation, robot behavior, image processing, object recognition, voice recognition, tele-operation, remote sensing, and autonomous navigation/patrol map building and localization.

Robot Manipulators
The AMI-100 is an industrial manipulator consisting of prismatic joints mounted on a fixed base, and a series of identical modules linked in an articulated SCARA configuration, which forms a snake-arm. It can be used for assembly, objects handling, maintenance, repair and further applications where a stationary arm with attached tools are used.

A portable tele-operated version of the AMI-100, the AEI-100 is an industrial manipulator, used primarily for materials handling from a distance. It is based on a modular redundant design which allows basic models to carry high payloads.

Manual Arms
The Anatergoarm AEA-15, winner of the gold medal at the 31st international Geneva Exhibition and a finalist in IDM, is a manual arm Designed in collaboration with Michel Dallaire Design Industrielle. It mimics the bio-mechanical movement of the human body which allows workers performing repetitive tasks to simplify their work, especially when using heavy tools. It incorporates an automatic safety brake system which allows the arm to remain stationary at will.

A portable Anatergoarm model, the TMA-500 is an assisted manipulator for maintenance and handling in of hydro-electric turbines. The first TMA-500 arm was deployed in 2010 at Hydro Quebec's  Robert-Bourassa generating station for breaking unit repairs.  It won the IRSST's 2011 "Work health and safety innovation" award at the 21st edition of the innovation awards organized by ADRIQ and its partners.

Special Projects

BIXI

Named the 19th best invention of 2008 by Time magazine, BIXI Montréal utilizes Robotics Design Inc.’s modular docking station. The BIXI-branded system, created by the Public Bike System Company, is solar powered and can be removed and replaced quickly allowing entire stations to be deployed or removed in minutes. The BIXI system was first developed for the Montreal public bike system but is now utilized internationally, from New York City to Melbourne.

ADC 
ADC (Automated Deployable Container) is an invention that allows the transportation and deployment of habitable units. ADC helps humanitarian aid workers easily install housing, hospitals, and schools, making it possible to construct a temporary city in less than a week. The container is deployed automatically with a button control, and can change shape from a standard container compartment to a three compartment unit including kitchens and sanitary rooms. It is equipped with heating and air conditioning systems.

See also

References

External links
 Official website

Robotics companies
Industrial machine manufacturers
Manufacturing companies based in Montreal
Companies established in 1997
1997 in robotics
Technology companies of Canada
Canadian brands